The 2016–17 Cupa României preliminary rounds make up the qualifying competition to decide which teams take part in the main competition from first round . This is the 79th season of the most prestigious football cup competition of Romania.

The qualifying rounds took place between October 2015 and June 2016.

First round

Argeș 

These matches played on 7–10 October 2015

First-round results: Argeș

Alba 
These matches played on 29 and 30 August 2015

First-round results: Alba

Arad 
First-round results: Arad

Bihor 
These matches played on 5 and 6 March 2016

First-round results: Bihor

Bacău 
These matches will be played on 27 April 2016

First-round results: Bacău

Bistrița-Năsăud 
These matches played on 8, 15 and 22 November 2015

First-round results: Bistrița-Năsăud

Botoșani 
First-round results: Botoșani

Brăila 
First-round results: Brăila

Bucharest 
First-round results: Bucharest

References

Preliminary Rounds